Kyle Micallef (born January 8, 1987) is a Maltese weightlifter. He competed in the men's 85 kg event at the 2016 Summer Olympics but did not finish.

References

1987 births
Living people
Maltese male weightlifters
Olympic weightlifters of Malta
Weightlifters at the 2016 Summer Olympics